Thule was, in ancient Greek and Roman literature and cartography, a semi-mythical place located in the far north, usually an island.
Thule may also refer to:

People
 Thule people, ancestors of the Inuit

Places
 Thule, Greenland
 Thule Harbor, Greenland
 Thule Island, in the South Sandwich Islands
 Thule Islands, a group of Antarctic islands
 Mount Thule, Bylot Island, Nunavut, Canada; a mountain
 279 Thule, an asteroid
 Thule, the smaller lobe of the trans-Neptunian object 486958 Arrokoth, nicknamed Ultima Thule at the time of the New Horizons flyby

Fictional locations
 Thule, a fictional version of Greenland in the Kinderen van Moeder Aarde novels by Thea Beckman

Companies and organizations
 Thule Group, a Sweden-based company which designs and manufactures outdoor and cargo products
 Thule Society, a German occultist group and forerunner of the Nazi Party
 White Order of Thule, an American white supremacist group

Military
 Thule Air Base, USAF/NORAD base on Greenland
 Thule Tracking Station, USAF station on Greenland
 Radio Mast Thule, a longwave guyed transmission tower in Greenland
 , a Swedish navy ship name
 , a British navy ship name

Other uses
 Graphium thule (G. thule) a species of butterfly

See also

 
 
 1968 Thule Air Base B-52 crash
 Thulegate, a political scandal involving nuclear weapons
 Ultima Thule (disambiguation)
 Thyle, a court position
 Taake, a black metal band from Norway formerly known as Thule.